Charaxes ethalion, the satyr emperor or satyr charaxes, is a butterfly of the family Nymphalidae. It is found in southern Africa.

Description

The wingspan is 45–55 mm in males and 50–63 mm in females. Ch. ethalion Bdv. Very nearly allied to c. etheocles and only differing in the male in the genital armature and in the female in having the cell of the forewing above unicolorous, never with light spots. Male: wings above velvety black, almost without metallic gloss. Forewing above without marginal spots and at most with a postdiscal and a discal spot; spot in the cell often absent. Hindwing with small or indistinct whitish submarginal dots and greenish, in cellules 4–6 often red-yellow marginal streaks. The female is similar  to that of etheocles f. etheocles, but has no spot in the cell of the forewing. The markings are white, ochre-yellow or bluish. Cape to British East Africa. — Larva unicolorous green with a yellowish-bordered spot on the sixth segment. —ab. kitungulensis Strand has two postdiscal spots in 6 and 7, but no other light spots on the forewing. German East Africa.
A full description is also given by Rothschild, W. And Jordan, K., 1900 Novitates Zoologicae  Volume 7:478-479  (for terms see Novitates Zoologicae  Volume 5:545-601  )

Biology
The habitat is forest and dense moist savanna, including Brachystegia woodland.

Larvae feed on Albizia spp., Newtonia buchananii, Peltophorum africanum, Dichrostachys cinerea, Acacia ataxacantha, and Scutia myrtina.

Notes on the biology of ethalion are given by Pringle et al. (1994), and  Kielland, J. (1990).

Subspecies

Listed alphabetically:
C. e. binghami Henning, 1982 (Zambia, northern Zimbabwe)
C. e. ethalion Boisduval, 1847 (Mozambique, eastern Zimbabwe, Eswatini, South Africa: Limpopo Province, Mpumalanga, KwaZulu-Natal)
C. e. fisheri Henning, 1982 (Zambia: north to the southern part of Lake Tanganyika)
C. e. handmani Henning, 1982 (Malawi: south to the Mlanje district)
C. e. kikuyuensis van Someren, 1967 (Kenya: highlands east of the Rift Valley)
C. e. kitungulensis Strand, 1911. (Tanzania, Malawi, Democratic Republic of the Congo: Lualaba, Shaba, Maniema)
C. e. littoralis van Someren, 1967 (eastern Kenya, eastern Tanzania)
C. e. marsabitensis van Someren, 1967 (Kenya: north to Mount Marsabit)
C. e. nyanzae van Someren, 1967 (Uganda, south-western Kenya, western Tanzania, Democratic Republic of the Congo: east to Lake Mweru)

Similar species
Charaxes pondoensis and Charaxes karkloof

Taxonomy
Charaxes ethalion is a member of the large species group Charaxes etheocles.

Realm
Afrotropical realm

References

External links
 Charaxes ethalion images subspecies and forma
at Consortium for the Barcode of Life.
Images of C. ethalion ethalion Royal Museum for Central Africa (Albertine Rift Project)
Images of C. ethalion kikuyuensis (Albertine Rift Project)
Images of C. ethalion kitungulensis  (Albertine Rift Project)

ethalion
Butterflies described in 1847